Nikolajs Kozačuks (born 7 August 1985) is a Latvian former football midfielder.

Club career 
As a youth player Nikolajs Kozačuks played for his local club FK Ventspils, being included in the first team squad for the 2003 season. The youngster played there till 2006 and during these 4 seasons was mainly used in the reserve team, although in the 2005 season he played 13 first team matches in the Latvian Higher League. During his time with FK Ventspils Kozačuks helped the club win the Latvian Cup for 3 seasons in a row. In January 2007 he moved to the Czech 2. Liga, signing a contract with FC Vítkovice. He played 8 matches for the club and left it at the end of the season, joining the Latvian First League club FK Vindava in July 2007. Scoring 10 goals, he helped the club win the league and earn a straight promotion to the Latvian Higher League.  In the 2008 season he was the club's top scorer with 8 league goals as the club finished the season in the 8th position of the league table. As FK Vindava refused to play in the Latvian Higher League for the upcoming season, Kozačuks started the 2009 season with the Latvian First League club FK Tukums 2000. In July 2009 he moved to the Azerbaijan Premier League club Olimpik-Shuvalan, signing a two-year contract. Failing to establish himself as a first eleven player, at the start of 2010 Kozačuks returned to Ventspils, signing a contract with the Latvian Higher League club FC Tranzit. In summer 2010 he moved to the Israeli Liga Leumit and joined Hapoel Nir Ramat HaSharon. Kozačuks changed clubs within the league in February 2011, when he was transferred to Ahva Arraba. In July 2011 he returned to his local club FK Ventspils before the 2011–12 UEFA Europa League campaign.  Kozačuks was included in the entry for the 2012 season of Daugava Rīga, but did not appear in a single match throughout the season. In 2013, he became a first eleven player, appearing in 9 league matches. In July 2013 Kozačuks moved to the Polish I liga club Górnik Łęczna.

Honours 
FK Ventspils
 Latvian Higher League champion (1): 2011
 Latvian Cup winner (3): 2003, 2004, 2005
FK Vindava
 Latvian First League champion (1): 2007
Hapoel Nir Ramat HaSharon
 Toto Cup winner (1): 2010-2011

References

External links 
 
 
 

1985 births
Living people
People from Ventspils
Latvian footballers
FK Ventspils players
FC Tranzīts players
FK Daugava (2003) players
MFK Vítkovice players
AZAL PFK players
Hapoel Nir Ramat HaSharon F.C. players
Ahva Arraba F.C. players
Górnik Łęczna players
Latvian expatriate footballers
Expatriate footballers in the Czech Republic
Expatriate footballers in Azerbaijan
Expatriate footballers in Israel
Expatriate footballers in Poland
Expatriate footballers in Norway
Latvian expatriate sportspeople in the Czech Republic
Latvian expatriate sportspeople in Azerbaijan
Latvian expatriate sportspeople in Israel
Latvian expatriate sportspeople in Poland
Latvian expatriate sportspeople in Norway
Association football midfielders